This is a list of former public and private high schools in New Orleans.
 Holy angels

Former New Orleans high schools
Abramson Science and Technology Charter School
Alcee Fortier High School
Alfred Lawless High School
Algiers Technology Academy
Bishop McManus Academy
Boys High School
Clifton L. Ganus High School
Commercial High School
Consolidated Boys High School
Cor Jesu High School
Crescent Leadership Academy
Desire Street Academy
Francis T. Nicholls High School
G. W. Carver Collegiate Academy
G. W. Carver Preparatory Academy
George Washington Carver Senior High School
Greater Gentilly High School
KIPP Booker T. Washington High School
KIPP Renaissance High School
Joseph S. Clark Senior High School
Joseph S. Clark Preparatory High School 
Lake Area New Tech Early College High School
L.B. Landry High School
L. E. Rabouin Career Magnet School
L. E. Rabouin Vocational High School
L. E. Rabouin Memorial Trades School
Marion Abramson High School
Martin Behrman High School
McDonogh 35 Senior High School
Mid-City Baptist School
Miller-McCoy Academy
New Orleans Academy
New Orleans Center for Health Careers High School
New Orleans Public Schools Alternative High School
New Orleans High School Signature Centers 
O. Perry Walker High School
Pierre Capdau Early College High School
Prytania Private School
Redeemer High School
Redeemer-Seton High School
Redemptorist Boys and Girls High School
St. Aloysius Catholic High School
St. Joseph Academy 
S. J. Peters High School
Schwarz Alternative School
Seton Academy
Sojourner Truth Academy
Thurgood Marshall Early College High School
Walter L. Cohen High School
Xavier University Preparatory School

Sources:

See also
List of high schools in Louisiana
List of former high schools in Louisiana
List of school districts in Louisiana

References

High schools, former, New Orleans
high schools